Zeyndanlu-ye Sofla (also Romanized as Zeyndānlū-ye Soflá; also known as Zeydānlūy-e Pā’īn and Zeydānlū) is a village in Shahrestaneh Rural District, Now Khandan District, Dargaz County, Razavi Khorasan Province, Iran. At the 2006 census, its population was 361, in 77 families.

References 

Populated places in Dargaz County